Khira sagara is an Odia sweet dish that literally translates to ocean of milk in the Odia language. The sweet has depiction in the Hindu mythological scripture about Lakshmi serving Vishnu and Madhusudana with it.

Khira sagara consists of marble-sized balls of chhena cheese soaked in sweetened, condensed milk. Saffron and cardamoms are the typical seasonings that are added to this dish. Khira sagara is typically served either at room temperature or slightly chilled.

This dish is probably ras malai's predecessor. However, the milk base in khira sagara is thicker, acquiring the consistency of rabri.

See also

Chhena gaja
Chhena jalebi
Chhena kheeri
Chhena poda
Kheer
Rasabali
Rasagolla

References 

Indian desserts
Odia cuisine
Indian cheeses
Indian dairy products